Northeastern High School may refer to:

Northeastern High School (Michigan), Detroit, Michigan
Northeastern High School (North Carolina), Elizabeth City, North Carolina
Northeastern High School (Indiana), Fountain City, Indiana
Northeastern High School (Ohio), Springfield, Ohio
Northeastern High School (Pennsylvania), Manchester, Pennsylvania

See also
North East High School (disambiguation)
Northeast High School (disambiguation)